Manuel Galduf (born 1942 in Llíria), is a Spanish Orchestra conductor.

Career

Galduf studied at the Valencia Conservatory of Music (Orchestra musical direction, composition, violin, piano and oboe), having among his teachers Valencian composer Manuel Palau. He undertook postgraduate education with Volker Wangenheim (German conductor) and Igor Markevitch (Ukrainian conductor). Professor Galduf and Markevich developed an intense professional relationship being considered Markevich's favorite postgraduate student in the early 1960s. Galduf was military music director until 1980, at the same time that was conducting prestigious orchestras all around the globe and being professor of Orchestra direction at the Seville Conservatory. He gave up the army and focused on a Musical Director career. He has conducted several prestigious worldwide orchestras such as Nationale de France, English Chamber Orchestra, Hungarian Philharmonic, National of Venezuela. Florida Festival Orchestra, Dresdner Philarmonie, etc. From 1983 until 1997 he was the principal conductor of the Valencia Orchestra and has conducted most of the current Spanish symphonic orchestras. He is known for having premiered many current Spanish compositors works.

He was professor of Orchestral Conducting at the Valencia Conservatory until 2012 when he retired. He is fellow of the Royal Societies of Arts San Fernando and San Carlos. Several Galduf's students have reached highest positions in both conducting and composition being two remarkable examples Cesar Cano (Spanish Musical Compositor) and Pilar Vaño (Orchestra Conductor). Since 1999 he is the principal director of the Youth Orchestra of Valencia where he is doing a great job in order to identify future talented young musicians.

External links 
 Instituto Valenciano de la Música.
 Conservatorio Superior de Música de Valencia.

See also 
 Orquesta de Valencia
 Real Academia de Bellas Artes de San Fernando
 Ateneo Musical y de Enseñanza Banda Primitiva de Liria

References 

1942 births
Living people
Spanish conductors (music)
Male conductors (music)
People from Valencia
21st-century conductors (music)
21st-century male musicians
Spanish male musicians